Mayco Vivas (born 2 June 1998) is an Argentine rugby union player who plays for the Jaguares. On 28 December 2018, Vivas was named in the Jaguares squad for the 2019 Super Rugby season. His playing position is prop.

On 5 October 2022, Vivas travels to England to join Gloucester in the Premiership Rugby from the 2022-23 season.

References

External links
 itsrugby Profile

Jaguares (Super Rugby) players
Rugby union props
Argentine rugby union players
1998 births
Living people
Club Atlético del Rosario rugby union players
Argentina international rugby union players